The Mitsubishi F-X (unofficially called F-3) is a sixth-generation stealth fighter in development for the Japan Air Self-Defense Force (JASDF). It is Japan's first domestically developed stealth fighter jet and will replace the Mitsubishi F-2 by the mid–2030s. Its development is to also bolster the nation's defense industry and potentially enter the international arms market amid Japan's change in defense posture. In October 2020, Mitsubishi Heavy Industries was selected as the lead developer.

On 9 December 2022 the governments of Japan, the United Kingdom, and Italy jointly announced that they would develop and deploy a common fighter jet under a project called the Global Combat Air Programme (GCAP); merging development of the latter two nations’ BAE Systems Tempest with the F-X. In Japan, Mitsubishi Heavy Industries will be the prime contractor, with IHI Corporation handling the engines and Mitsubishi Electric handling the electronics. In the UK, BAE Systems will handle the aircraft, Rolls-Royce the engines and Leonardo UK the electronics. Leonardo S.p.A. and Avio Aero will participate in the development from Italy, and MBDA will also participate in the missile development. By around 2024, detailed development and cost sharing for each company will be clarified, and production will begin around 2030, with the first aircraft to be deployed in 2035. In addition, joint development with the United States will begin in fiscal 2023 for an unmanned aircraft accompanying the F-3.

Development

Origins 

The F-X program began when the United States banned exports of the Lockheed Martin F-22 Raptor as part of the 1997 Obey amendment in order to safeguard its technology. With Japan no longer able to purchase the F-22, a domestically developed fighter was chosen instead to replace Japan's aging fleet of fighter jets. Between December 2009 and August 2010, the Ministry of Defense (MoD) conducted a study of developing a future fighter jet to replace the F-2. The research conducted called for a new fighter jet that would be a generation ahead of contemporary fifth-generation fighters. The concept fighter was named the i3 Fighter (Informed, Intelligent, Instantaneous). Some technology and capabilities the concept fighter is to possess include advanced radar systems to counter stealth technology of other fighters, receiving targeting information from other platforms (drones, fighters and/or airborne early warning and control aircraft), use of fly-by-optics (much like the Kawasaki P-1) to process information faster, stealth technology, gallium nitride semiconductors to improve radar performance, and a new, more powerful engine.

Mitsubishi X-2 demonstrator 

Much of the development of the F-X program correlates with the development of the Mitsubishi X-2 Shinshin. The development of the X-2 demonstrator allows Japan to obtain new information and develop new technology related to their next generation fighter jet. The X-2 made its maiden flight on 22 April 2016. The X-2's testing concluded in March 2018.

Continued development and procurement strategy

Aircraft components 
Concurrent to the X-2's development and testing, evaluations were made on various researches related to the F-X. These researches and tests continue as Japan sought international collaboration on the F-X.

In mid-September 2019, flight tests were conducted on integrated sensors to be used for the F-X. The sensors were tested on board an F-2 fighter and the results are said to be good.

F-X program and international collaboration 
In March 2017, Japan and U.K. signed an agreement to explore the possibility on co-developing a future fighter jet. By March 2018, a MoD representative has stated that the Japanese government is deciding whether to develop the F-X domestically, through joint-development, or develop it based on an existing fighter design. At the time the Japanese government sent out proposals to the U.S. and U.K., seeking out their participation in the project. Boeing, Lockheed Martin, BAE Systems and Northrop Grumman have responded to the proposal. It is reported that Boeing offered an upgraded fighter based on their F-15, while similarly BAE systems offered their Eurofighter Typhoon. Lockheed Martin proposed a F-22/35 hybrid fighter while also offering Japan the majority of the work in developing and producing the fighter. Northrop Grumman has expressed interest in joining the project; with speculation that a modernized YF-23 might be offered to Japan. Japan and U.K. have also further explored the possibility on collaborating the F-X project with the Tempest project to some capacity.

By October 2018, the MoD has begun to rule out the possibility of developing a fighter based on existing designs. Boeing's F-15 and BAE Systems' Eurofighter Typhoon reportedly failed to meet the ministry's requirements. Lockheed Martin's hybridized stealth fighter was also met with doubt due to its expensive price, as well as uncertainties that the U.S. would allow the sale given the export ban on the F-22. One report indicated that the hybrid fighter could cost as high as $177 million per aircraft.

In early February 2019, the MoD announced that a 'Japan-led' Future Fighter program will be initiated, with collaboration with foreign defense contractors still being an option. The announcement further enforces that plans to develop or locally produce existing foreign-made fighter jets has been ruled out. Furthermore, the program will prioritize domestic industries to develop and produce the stealth fighter. The program will occur between 2019–2023 in line with the MoD's Mid-Term Defense Program and will take 15 years to complete; around the time when the F-2 begins to retire. The MoD prioritized five key aspects for the program's development:
 Capability for future air superiority
 Potential to expand capability by incorporating next generation technologies
 Ability to modify and upgrade the new platform
 Participation of Japanese industry
 Affordable cost

On 21 August 2019, the MoD announced that development of the stealth fighter will commence between April–December 2020 in accordance to the FY 2020 defense budget. The funding that the MoD acquires will be used to initiate the fighter program. By December 2019, the MoD secured ¥11.1 billion for the FY 2020 defense budget to launch the program. In total ¥28 billion is used to fund the F-X development for FY 2020. Of the total budget, ¥16.9 billion (60%) is used for research projects, while the remaining ¥11.1 billion (40%) is used to launch the program and begin conceptional design. It is within the FY 2020 defense budget that a new conceptional image of the stealth fighter has been revealed and the name of the program has been officially changed from "Future Fighter" to "F-X".

On 27 March 2020, Japan rejected designs proposed by Lockheed Martin, Boeing and BAE Systems. The designs submitted by all three defense contractors include: a hybridized F-22/35 fighter, a design based on the Boeing F/A-18E/F Super Hornet, and another based on the Eurofighter Typhoon respectively. According to an official from the Acquisition, Technology & Logistics Agency (ATLA) the designs did not meet their requirements and that no decision has been reached on the air-frame design. The decision places Mitsubishi Heavy Industries at the forefront in developing the stealth fighter. However, the decision did not rule out the possibility of international collaboration; as Lockheed Martin, Boeing, Northrop Grumman and BAE Systems are still listed as potential partners. This decision was further confirmed by Jane's. An ATLA spokesperson has stated that "the option of 'developing derivatives of existing fighters' cannot be a candidate from the perspective of a Japan-led development, and the MoD has come to the conclusion that we will develop a new model". The spokesperson further elaborated the MoD has developed enough technology to possibly develop the F-X domestically, but the option of international collaboration still exists. On 1 April 2020, ATLA established a dedicated team to develop the F-X. The team is led by a major-general from the Japan Air Self-Defense Force (JASDF) and consists of 30 JASDF officers, engineering officials and others. Subaru Corporation also announced that it will establish a Technology Development Center to support the F-X's development.

, the MoD expects production of the first fighter prototype to begin in 2024, with flight tests starting in 2028. Full-scale production is expected to commence by 2031.

In June 2021, Japan said that it was in discussions with British officials regarding the cooperation with Rolls-Royce on engine development.

Design

Overview 
The F-X is a twin engine stealth fighter designed for achieving air superiority. By the Japanese MoD's own terminology, the technology and capabilities the F-X possesses will classify it as a sixth generation fighter jet.

The F-X is said to be bigger than the F-22, which has earned it the nickname "Godzilla" from Bradley Perrett at Aviation Week. The large size indicates the MoD desires the aircraft to possess very long range and large payload capacity. Technologies tested in the X-2 technology demonstrator will likely be incorporated into the F-X fighter. Defense Minister Taro Kono has stated that the F-X will possess strong network capabilities and will carry more missiles than the F-35.

In the design process, conceptual designs of the F-X are made, then passed through a 3-D digital mock-up system. Designs are based on the assumed function and performance of the F-X, and then installed in a research flight/battle simulator developed by the Technical Research Division. Data on avionics, stealth and engine characteristics are inputted into the simulator, and are then tested by JASDF pilots. Through air-to-air combat simulations, the effectiveness and improvements to the mock-up design are gauged.

Compared to its predecessor, the F-X replaces the usage of conventional hydraulic systems with electric actuators. According to the MoD's evaluation, the reason for selecting electric actuators over hydraulic systems is because of the complexity of designing the interior of the stealth fighter. When designing the stealth shape of the aircraft, the internal weapon bay and intake air-ducts must be accounted for. However, problems arise with installing hydraulic system piping due to design considerations such as rigidity and length. The adoption of electric actuators eliminates these constraints because they are only connected via electric wiring. This results in simplified installation and reduced restrictions, allowing more flexibility in designing the body of the aircraft. Other advantages include weight reduction and improved mobility of the aircraft. The electric actuators are used in the fighter's control, power and undercarriage/wheel braking systems.

To achieve a lightweight body structure, the F-X implements several technologies and manufacture/design techniques. One method involves reducing or eliminating the use of fasteners by bonding composite materials together through adhesive molding. This method is dubbed the "integrated/fastenerless structure" technology. Heat shield technology is placed around the engines to allow aluminum alloys and carbon fiber reinforced polymer (CFRP) to be applied to reduce weight. High-efficiency/high-accuracy structural analysis techniques used for the F-X involve creating finite element method (FEM) models using computer-aided design (CAD) to study and create stress analysis standards for the F-X. The F-X's predecessor, the F-2, introduced integrated molding and CFRP material to reduce its overall weight, but the molding technique applied only on the bottom plates of the wings; requiring fasteners to be placed through the upper plates in the main wing and other areas using fasteners on both plates. In comparison, the F-X expands the application of CFRP and adhesive molding to the entire fuselage. From the MoD's research, it was shown that adopting the new design methods can reduce the structural mass of the F-X's airframe by 11.6% and – for a portion of the middle fuselage – reduce working man-hours by 66% compared to conventional approaches.

To cope with the heat produced by the avionic systems, a small dedicated heat transfer system is installed in the F-X to assist its air cycle and liquid cooling system. The heat transfer system is modeled on the vapor-compression refrigeration cycle.

Avionics 
To improve detection against stealth aircraft, the F-X utilizes integrated sensors. The sensors include: an active electronically scanned array (AESA) radar, passive radio frequency (RF) sensor, and an infrared camera. Both the AESA radar and RF sensor utilize Gallium nitride (GaN) to improve its performance. The AESA radar is based on the J/APG-2 radar used on the F-2 fighter and is similar to the AN/APG-81 radar used in the F-35.

The F-X possess a RF 'self-defense' system to counter aircraft, air-to-air missile and surface-to-air missile threats. The system performs both ESM and ECM by being alerted to the threat and disrupting its radio waves instantly and globally. Integrated ESM body antennas are placed along the wing and tail flap of the fighter jet.

Cockpit 
The helmet-mounted display features a wide field of vision, binocular, multi-color display, voice recognition and 3-D sound.

Stealth 
To minimize its radar cross section, F-X physical design features serpentine air-ducts and an internal weapons bay. Electromagnetic wave absorbers are applied to the air-ducts and engines to reduce the amount of radar reflection. The absorber is said to be of carbon-based material. According to results of tests conducted, the RCS reduction done from the absorbers has the equivalent effect of reducing detection range from radar threats by about half. Metamaterials are also used to reflect radio waves. The metamaterials consists of various materials including small pieces of metals and dielectric. The metamaterials are applied on the pulse doppler system as part of a radio wave reflection control technology on board the F-X.

To avoid having its radar emissions detected, the F-X maximizes its usage of passive detection. Its sensor programs also operate its radar emissions in a way that reduces the likelihood of counter detection during radar emissions.

The F-X uses plasma stealth antenna technology to deflect radio waves. The antenna operates by creating temporary plasma using characteristics of plasma that can change physical properties through electrical control. While activated the antenna is also capable of transmitting and receiving communication.

Engine 

The F-X will be powered by two XF9 engines. As of 2018, the officially publicized thrust level of the prototype engine is "11 tons (107 kN / 24,000 lbf) or more" in military thrust and "15 tons (147 kN / 33,000 lbf) or more" with afterburner. The XF9 is designed to be adaptable to a wide range of thrust level, higher or lower, depending on requirement; and the future fighter engine program is conducted with a target maximum thrust of 20 tons (196 kN / 44,000 lbf) in mind, which was unveiled at the ATLA Technology Symposium 2018. The XF9 possesses a high combustion temperature at 1800 °C. Noteworthy of the XF9 is its slim size relative to its power. For instance, the engine inlet of the XF9 is 30% smaller than the General Electric F110 used on the F-2. The slim design is needed in order to accommodate weapons internally to preserve the aircraft's stealth. The XF9 has a large electrical power output of 180 kW, thus the F-X will receive 360 kW combined from both of its engines. The large energy generation is needed to supply the fighter's powerful avionics and equipment. The engines incorporate three dimensional thrust vector nozzles to allow the aircraft to achieve high maneuverability and improve stealth capabilities. The engine's thrust vector nozzle can deflect thrust up to 20 degrees in all circumference directions.

Armaments 

The ASM-3 has been developed for the F-X to use as the F-2 gets phased out. The F-X will be armed with a microwave weapon to disrupt incoming missiles. The microwave weapon is activated from the stealth fighter's AESA radar through the use of electron tube amplifiers capable of high efficiency and miniaturization.

Drone control 
Japan plans on introducing unmanned combat aerial vehicles that can operate alongside the F-X, called the Combat Support Unmanned Aircraft. The drone program is similar to the Kratos XQ-58 Valkyrie or Boeing Airpower Teaming System project in which the drone acts as a "loyal wingman" to the controlling aircraft. There are two versions of the drone: one that is a sensor carrier and scouts for targets, and another that fires munitions and directs incoming missiles away from the parent aircraft. Both versions share the same design as each other. The drones are expected to be fully developed by the 2030s.

Significance and issues

Domestic industry 

Within Japan, the development of the X-2 and the F-X is seen as chance for Japan to revitalize its defense/aerospace industry and establish a foothold within the international arms market. In the aftermath following World War II, Japan's defense and aerospace sector was crushed, forcing the nation to enter a long period of rebuilding. As a result, Japan mostly built US made aircraft under license to sustain its industry, while historically struggled to produce their own domestically design aircraft, both civilian and military alike. The F-2 fighter in particular was widely controversial in Japan. First conceived as a 'pure' Japanese fighter, the F-2 was to incorporate the latest technology Japan had to offer and become a sort of spiritual successor to the famous Mitsubishi A6M Zero. However, the decision to joint-develop the aircraft with the US was later chosen due to a combination of US political pressure and the heavy undertaking of producing a fighter domestically. Combined with the delays and lack of profit and growth obtained for Japan's domestic industries, the F-2 went on to become an expensive, controversial fighter. As such, with the introduction of the F-X, Japanese lawmakers and defense officials are adamant in avoiding a repeat of the F-2's controversial development.

Domestic development is generally favored the most by defense industry groups and lawmakers but the expected high cost and inexperience developing a domestic fighter are among the biggest challenges faced with domestic development. International collaboration is seen as another option with the benefit of easing the financial burden but can lead to difficulties in coordinating with the partner/s of the project. Furthermore, Japanese lawmakers are adamant that domestic companies should lead the project to secure profit and preserve the defense industry. Air Marshal B.K. Pandey, former Air Officer Commanding-in-Chief of Training Command of the Indian Air Force, noted that the F-X will likely face technological challenges as the technologies used in fighter jets have become more complex over the years.

Foreign collaboration
According to Gregg Rubinstein of Carnegie Endowment for International Peace, the US and Japan have differing approaches and priorities on joint-developing the stealth fighter. US defense officials emphasized that operational concepts and capability requirements should be the basis for fighter acquisition. In contrast, the Japanese officials have prioritized technology development and industrial base interest. In addition, the bitter legacy of the F-2 casts a shadow over discussions between the two countries. In light of the F-2, there are concerns that Japan will be unable to have control of its partnership with the US.

At the same time, military cooperation between the UK and Japan has expanded over the years. Discussions on joint-development between both countries have been described as "open-minded and flexible". Gregg Rubinstein has also noted that both countries have developed an interest in each other; noting that in a post-Brexit environment Britain will be looking beyond the EU for partners and Japan will desire to gain some independence from the US for its domestic industry. However, this increased cooperation elicited some reactions from the US. In mid-April 2019, several reports indicated that the U.S. was willing to disclose portions of the F-35's software to Japan in exchange for joint development on the F-X fighter. These reports stated the offer was made in response to outdo 'rival' Britain in securing a deal with Japan. According to the Financial Times, there were concerns among US officials that Japan would select BAE Systems as its international partner over US defense contractors. As a result, the Trump administration reportedly exerted political pressure on Japan to joint-develop the F-X with the US. There were concerns that selecting a British fighter jet would increase interoperability difficulties between it and the US military and US-made aircraft in Japan, thus complicating joint operations. Another was that selecting the UK would anger then-President Trump amidst a cost-sharing dispute regarding stationing US forces in Japan. Nikkei Asian Review noted in 2020 that between choosing the UK or US as a partner, the UK would offer greater flexibility for Japan in developing the F-X while Japan still places high importance on its alliance with the US. In early March of 2020, a report from Nikkei Asian Review indicated that Japan planned on selecting the US for collaboration despite the ongoing discussions between Japan and the US and UK at the time of the reporting. While ATLA responded by stating that US and UK discussions were still ongoing, the report suggested that the US still has a strong influence over Japan because of their alliance. On 25 August 2020, Japan’s defense minister stated that "[Japan is] currently exchanging information with the US and UK to deepen our consideration of international co-operation in this development project.”

Geopolitical 
The development of the F-X allows Japan to catch up to and counter Russian and Chinese stealth fighters. Within East Asia, the F-X allows Japan to not lag behind China and South Korea's stealth fighter pursuit.

The F-X was also designed primarily in response to concerns of Chinese, North Korean, and Russian military threats. Japan MoD considers China's rapid military buildup and disputes in the East and South China Sea as a primary security concern; along with North Korea's nuclear weapons program and Russia's increased military activities. With regards to China, the F-X would likely be used to counter advanced Chinese fighter jets: Shenyang J-11, Chengdu J-20, and Shenyang FC-31. Experts believe that the stealth jet would likely unnerve China to Japan's increased militarization.

Japan's development of the F-X, along with China, India and South Korea's stealth fighter programs, are noted as an increased trend of Asian aerospace industries challenging Western and Russian dominance in the global fighter jet industry. As of 2018, 90% of combat aircraft flown in all of the world's air forces comes from the US, USSR/Russia, Britain, France and Sweden. If the F-X (along with other fighter jets) is successfully designed then the focus of the fighter jet industry could shift from the Northern Atlantic closer to the Asia-Pacific. If it is exported, it could potentially become a serious challenge to the West's predominance in the fighter industry.

See also
 F/A-XX program
 Next Generation Air Dominance
 Mikoyan PAK DP
 BAE Systems Tempest
 Future Combat Air System

References

Mitsubishi Heavy Industries aircraft
Stealth aircraft
Twinjets
Japanese fighter aircraft